was a statesman in early Meiji period Japan.

Biography
Yamada was born in Kumamoto Domain, Higo Province (present-day Kumamoto Prefecture). He was active in the Sonnō jōi movement, relocated to Satsuma Domain during the Bakumatsu period. Captured by security forces of the Tokugawa shogunate in 1863, he was sentenced to five years in prison.

After the Meiji restoration, Yamada was recruited into the new Meiji government and was assigned as governor of the short-lived Esashi Prefecture (now part of Akita and Iwate Prefectures in 1871.

Although Yamada was sympathetic to the grievances of the ex-samurai class and personally acquainted with many of the leaders of the Shinpūren Rebellion in his native Kumamoto, he remained loyal to the Meiji government throughout the uprising. He was rewarded with the governorships of Shimane Prefecture (1881–1888), Fukushima Prefecture (1888–1891), Osaka Prefecture (1891–1895) and Kyoto Prefecture (1895–1897). On June 5, 1896 he was elevated to the rank of baron (danshaku) in the kazoku   peerage system.

Yamada was selected Minister of Agriculture & Commerce in the second Matsukata Masayoshi cabinet from 1897-1898. He subsequently served as chairman of the Board of Audit to his death in 1900. His grave is at the Aoyama Cemetery in Tokyo.

 
 

1833 births
1900 deaths
People from Kumamoto Prefecture
Kazoku
People of Meiji-period Japan
Government ministers of Japan
Governors of Shimane Prefecture
Governors of Fukushima Prefecture
Governors of Osaka
Governors of Kyoto